The List of shipwrecks in the 1720s includes some ships sunk, wrecked or otherwise lost during the 1720s.

1720
In the British Empire, 1720 began on 25 March 25 rather than on 1 January.  Thus, the day before "25 March 1720" O.S. (old style) was "24 March 1719" (O.S.).  In most of continental Europe, the Gregorian calendar had already been adopted and the year began on 1 January 1720.  In addition, the "old style" Julian Calendar was 13 days behind the "new style" Gregorian calendar, so the day recorded as 1 January 1719 "old style" in the British press is now considered 14 January 1720.

September

26 September

November

24 November

1721

January

Unknown date

November

10 November

12 November

December

7 December

1722

June

16 June

17 June

November

20 November

1724

18 January (N.S.)

August

24 August

Unknown date

November

19 November

December

21 December

1725

March 1725 (N.S.)

8 March

August

26 August

1726

January 1726 (N.S.)

3 January 
(3 January 1726 N.S. and 20 December 1725 O.S.)

September

6 September

1727

June

9 June

25 June

1728
There is a public house in Walmer, Kent, UK, called The Stag. The building dates from 1715 and, as an inn, it was tenanted from 1733 by Nathaniel Long, also a sailmaker. The Stag is believed to have sunk near Deal in 1728 'under ill-fated circumstances'.  It is possible that Long had supplied the ship at some time.

1729

Unknown date

Notes
 Until 1752 in the British Empire, the year began on Lady Day (25 March) Thus 24 March 1720 was followed by 25 March 1721. 31 December 1721 was followed by 1 January 1721.

References

1720s